Christopher Towne Leland (born October 17, 1951) is an American novelist.

Early life and education
Leland was born October 17, 1951, in Tulsa, Oklahoma. He grew up in Tulsa; Charlotte, North Carolina; and Huntington Beach, California. He attended Pomona College, graduating in 1973. He then attended the University of California, San Diego, receiving his doctorate in 1982.

Career
Leland has taught at Wayne State University in Detroit, Michigan since 1990.

Works

References

20th-century American novelists
21st-century American novelists
People from Tulsa, Oklahoma
Wayne State University faculty
Pomona College alumni
University of California, San Diego alumni
People from Charlotte, North Carolina
People from Huntington Beach, California
1951 births
Living people